Pavandenė (Samogitian: Pavondenė) is a town in Telšiai County, Lithuania. According to the 2011 census, the town has a population of 317 people.

History 
The settlement dates back to the 14th century. It is known from 1596 that there was a manor in Pavanden. The owner of the manor, Jonas Burba Gervydas, shared his possession between his five sons, the village itself being the property of two - Stanislovas and Mykola.

In 1773 the settlement went to Bouffal. Later, the settlement was still owned by Danilevički and Sakeliste. In 1831, the resurrected Pavandenė formed the inhabitants' army. The settlement became a lowland in 1972.

References

Towns in Lithuania
Towns in Telšiai County
Telšiai District Municipality
Duchy of Samogitia
Telshevsky Uyezd